Ryan M. Maher is a Republican member of the South Dakota Senate, representing the 28th district since 2006.

External links
South Dakota Legislature - Ryan Maher official SD Senate website

Project Vote Smart - Senator Ryan M. Maher (SD) profile
Follow the Money - Ryan M Maher
2008 2006 campaign contributions

1977 births
American bankers
Living people
South Dakota Democrats
South Dakota Republicans
South Dakota state senators
People from Mobridge, South Dakota
People from Dewey County, South Dakota
Black Hills State University alumni
21st-century American politicians